Some Voices may refer to:

Some Voices (film), a 2000 British film directed by Simon Cellan Jones
Some Voices (EP), a 2002 EP by American indie rock band Pinback
Some Voices (play), a 1994 British play written by Joe Penhall